is a Japanese journalist and media scholar specialized in media literacy, gender and sexuality. She has been a Senior Researcher at Keio University Research Institute. Her research interest through nearly 20 years of career including as a TV news reporter has been the way of regulatory policy of obscene expressions. She has published research and provided media commentary on the topics of media communication and literacy of Japanese obscene content.

Works 
Watanabe works on the Japanese Government to apply a concept of "Dignity in Obscene Expression" to its regulatory policy. She has served as a lecturer of Internet moral education for Ministry of Education, Culture, Sports, Science and Technology, and also as a lecturer of human rights for Ministry of Justice.

Publications

Selected articles
2015 International trend and human rights over child pornography:the future agenda of Japan 
Information and Communications Policy Review No.10 March 2015

2012 A Review of Research which Discusses the Effects of Obscene Harmful Information from Old Media to the Internet The Japan Society of Information and Communication Research No.30 (2), 2012
2012 Regulations and Media Literacy Education on Online Obscene Harmful Information: A Japanese Perspective Keio Communication Review No.34, 2012

Books
2013 Media Literacy of Obscene Information among Youth in Japan (Amazon Services International, Inc.)
2010 When Children Expose Their Secrets Online: addicted to SNS (Shufunotomo Co., Ltd., Tokyo)
2008 The Truth of Cyber bullying (Minerva Publishing, Inc., Kyoto)
2007 Media Literacy for Adults (Liberta Publishing Co., Ltd., Tokyo)

Awards
Mayuko Watanabe has received prestigious awards as a director of Radio documentary Suicide of 16 years old boy- What did the bereaved family fight against?

2000 Highest award from the Japan Commercial Broadcasters Association 
2000 Award for excellence from the Hoso Bunka Foundation

References

External links 
Mayuko Watanabe Official Website

1975 births
Living people
People from Aichi Prefecture
Japanese women journalists
Japanese mass media scholars
Keio University alumni
Simon Fraser University alumni